Nasima Haider is a former Bangladeshi career diplomat.

Early life and education

Haider completer her graduation and post-graduation from University of Dhaka in English literature.

Career
Haider joined Bangladesh Civil Service as (Foreign Affairs) cadre in 1981.

References 

Living people
Year of birth missing (living people)

Bangladeshi diplomats
High Commissioners of Bangladesh to South Africa
University of Dhaka alumni
Ambassadors of Bangladesh to Egypt
High Commissioners of Bangladesh to Cyprus